The 2019–20 Luge World Cup was a multi race tournament over a season for Luge, organised by the FIL. The season started 23 November 2019 in Innsbruck, Austria, and finished 1 March 2020 in Königssee, Germany.

Calendar

Results

Men's singles

Women's singles

Doubles

Team relay

Standings

Men's singles 

Final standings after 12 events
(*Champion 2019)

Men's singles Sprint 

Final standings after 3 events
(*Champion 2019)
Only 6 lugers competed on all events

Women's singles 

Final standings after 12 events

Women's singles Sprint 

Final standings after 3 events
Only 8 lugers competed on all events

Doubles 

Final standings after 12 events
(*Champion 2019)

Doubles Sprint 

Final standings after 3 events
(*Champion 2019)

Team Relay 

Final standings after 6 events
(*Champion 2019)

Medal table

References

External links 

 FIL streaming service

2019–20
2019 in luge
2020 in luge